Kamen Opasnosti (Japanese 二丈岩　Nijouiwa) is an islet group of rocks, in La Pérouse Strait and the Sea of Okhotsk.

Geography

It is a small group of bare rocks, devoid of vegetation.

History
The rocks were a great hindrance to marine traffic in La Pérouse Strait, aggravated by frequent dense fogs in the summertime. To avoid possible collision, ships had to set some of their crew members on guard to locate Kamen Opasnosti by listening to the roar of sea lions living on it. A lighthouse was finally constructed on the rocks in 1913, during the Japanese administration of the area.

See also
Islands of the Sea of Okhotsk
Islands of the Russian Far East

Islands of the Sea of Okhotsk
Islands of the Russian Far East
Islands of Sakhalin Oblast
Uninhabited islands of Russia
Uninhabited islands of the Pacific Ocean